Normanby Island is a volcanic , L-shaped and mountainous island, the southernmost island in the D'Entrecasteaux Islands group. It is part of Milne Bay Province, Papua New Guinea. The island has an irregular and elongated shape measuring 73km in length (northwest-southeast).

It is also separated from Dobu Island, a smaller volcanic island, by a passage approximately 2.5km wide. The terrain includes low coastal plains and swamplands, high mountains and steep coastal slopes. Sewa Bay provides shelter on the west coast and Awaiara (Sewataitai) Bay on the east coast. The largest settlement, and the capital of the Esa'ala District, is Esa’ala at the island's northern end, which has a total of approximately 500 homes, residences, and structures.

The island currently has 2 main airports that allow travel to and from the island, those being Esa'ala Airport (ESA) and Sehulea Airport (AYSL). The Esa'ala Airport has one dirt runway that is 1.36km long (4,470 ft) and 60m (190ft) wide. The Sehulea Airport also has one unpaved runway, which is 830m (2,728ft) long and around 50m (170ft) wide.

In 1873, the island was visited by British Captain John Moresby, commanding HMS Basilisk, who named it after the Marquess of Normanby, George Augustus Constantine Phipps, a governor of Queensland, Australia.

Once known to produce gold, Normanby now exports copra and some timber. Recent discoveries of gold deposits during the 21st century have begun to be exploited.

Normanby Island is also a tourist destination, with many tourist trips and cruises going past the island for tourists to view the scenery, nature and wildlife on the island.

Economy 
Normanby Island's income comes from three main sources, tourism, gold mining, and the copra/timber industry. Gold mining activities on the island have recently made a comeback on the island after a Canadian mining company named "PNG Gold Corp" (PGK) discovered large amounts of gold on the island while drilling at the Imwauna Project Site, which is located on the southern, mountainous side of the island in the middle of the Prevost Range.

Local Population 
Normanby Island's population consists of small tribes and communities spread out across the entire island, with some of the tribes having histories going back thousands of years. Most of the individuals living on the island are indigenous peoples whose families have lived there for generations. There are at least 25 settlements on the island with more than 5 houses, with hundreds more small huts and farms scattered around the terrain. The island and its tribes are involved in the Kula Exchange, an exchange of goods between islands in the MASSIM archipelago that involves thousands of individuals who travel hundreds of miles by canoe in order to exchange Kula valuables. Villagers live in small, raised wood huts and in small close-knit communities. The inhabitants of the island speak in Austronesian language as part of the Trans-New Guinea language family. The two main settlements with the largest number of inhabitants on the island are Esa'ala on the northern side of the island followed by Sehulea on the south-eastern side of the island. The majority of the structures in both settlements are wooden huts made from nearby trees around the building. Most of the local population live along the shoreline.

References

D'Entrecasteaux Islands
Islands of Milne Bay Province